Torre d'Isola is a comune (municipality) in the Province of Pavia in the Italian region Lombardy, located about 30 km south of Milan and about 6 km northwest of Pavia. As of 30 June 2008, it had a population of 2,276 and an area of 16.3 km².

The municipality of Torre d'Isola contains the frazioni (subdivisions, mainly villages and hamlets) Carpana, Casottole, Massaua, Santa Sofia and Sanvarese.

Torre d'Isola borders the following municipalities: Bereguardo, Carbonara al Ticino, Marcignago, Pavia, Trivolzio, Zerbolò.

Demographic evolution

References

Cities and towns in Lombardy